Bolivia is divided into:
9 departments (departamentos)
112 provinces (provincias)
339 municipalities (municipios)
1374 cantons (cantones)

See also